Dniprova Chayka was the pen name of Liudmyla Vasylevska (October 20, 1861 – March 13, 1927), a Ukrainian educator and writer.

The daughter of a Russian village priest and a Ukrainian mother, she was born Liudmyla Berezyna in Karlivka in the southern Ukraine and was educated at a private gymnasium in Odessa. She worked as a private tutor and then taught in a village school and later high school. She compiled Ukrainian folk songs and oral tradition. In 1885, she married Teofan Vasylevsky, a Ukrainian historian and patriot. Because Ukrainian nationalist was suppressed within the Russian empire, the couple often found themselves under police surveillance and, in 1905, Vasylevska's writings were confiscated.

Her first poems and short stories were published in journals in Ukraine. She also wrote poems and fairy tales for children and the librettos for a number of children's  operettas; the scores were written by Mykola Lysenko. Berezyna also wrote poetry in Russian and translated Swedish and Russian literature into Ukrainian.

She and her husband separated after their children were grown up.

Vasylevska died in Hermanivka at the age of 65.

A collection of her works was published in 1929 and another in 1931. Her work was translated to English for the collection In the Dark of the Night (1998).

A commemorative coin bearing her image was released into circulation in Ukraine in 2011, the 150th anniversary of her birth. It was part of a series called "Outstanding Personalities of Ukraine".

References 

1861 births
1927 deaths
19th-century Ukrainian women writers
20th-century Ukrainian women writers
19th-century Ukrainian writers
20th-century Ukrainian writers
19th-century pseudonymous writers
20th-century pseudonymous writers
People from Mykolaiv Oblast
People from Ananyevsky Uyezd
Ukrainian women short story writers
Ukrainian short story writers
Pseudonymous women writers
Ukrainian women poets
Burials at Baikove Cemetery
Ukrainian-language writers
Translators to Ukrainian